Omo Ghetto: The Saga also known as Omo Ghetto 2 is a 2020 Nigerian gangster comedy film co-directed by Funke Akindele and JJC Skillz. The film stars Funke Akindele, Chioma Akpota, Nancy Isime, Eniola Badmus, Bimbo Thomas, Deyemi Okanlawon and Mercy Aigbe in the lead roles. This was the second film in the Omo Ghetto franchise and it was also the sequel to the 2010 trilogy film Omo Ghetto. The film had its theatrical release coinciding with Christmas on 25 December 2020 and was opened to extremely positive reviews from critics. The film became a box office success and surpassed Fate of Alakada as the highest grossing Nigerian film for the year 2020. As of 26 January 2021, when the film grossed ₦468 million at the box office it surpassed the record of 2016 film The Wedding Party to become the highest ever grossing film in the Nigerian film industry.

Cast 
 Funke Akindele as Lefty(Shalewa) & Ayomide
 Nancy Isime
 Eniola Badmus as Busty
 Naira Marley (cameo appearance)
 Chioma Akpotha as Chummy Choko
 Bimbo Thomas as Nikky
 Zubby Michael as Azaman
 Akah Nnani as Mario
 Tina Mba
 Blossom Chukwujekwu 
 Chigurl as Amaka
 Yemi Alade as Mogambe
 Mercy Aigbe
 Ayo Makun as Dafe
 Alex Ekubo as Obi Wire
 Timini Egbuson
 Deyemi Okanlawon
 Tobi Makinde
 Paschaline Alex Okoli
 Ronya Man
 Esther Kalejaye as Omo Joyoibo
 Slimcase
 Ibrahim Yekini
 Femi Jacobs
 Adebayo Salami as Baba Onibaba
 Shina Peters
 David Jones David
 Martinsfeelz
 Toke Makinwa
 Tega Akpobome (og.tega)

Production 
Akindele confirmed regarding the production of the sequel in February 2020 with a throwback photo of herself along with Eniola Badmus in an Instagram post. The principal photography of the film also commenced in February 2020. The film project also marked maiden collaboration between Funke Akindele and her husband JJC Skillz as co-directors of the film. Some of the portions of the film were shot in Dubai, United Arab Emirates and the film production was also affected due to the COVID-19 pandemic.

Popular singer Naira Marley was roped into playing a cameo appearance in the film and his film acting debut through this film. Yemi Alade, the singer also made her acting debut through this film as she landed a pivotal role.

Box office 
The film grossed over ₦189 million in the opening week since its release and it historically became the first Nollywood film ever to gross over ₦99 million in its opening weekend surpassing the previous record set by The Wedding Party 2. In its second week, the movie continued breaking box office records by grossing over  ₦132.4 million and firmly staying at the top of the Nigerian box office and bringing its 2-week gross to a record breaking ₦322 million and placing it as the fourth highest grossing Nigerian movie of all time.

In its third week, despite seeing a drop of 43% from the previous week, Omo Ghetto still topped the box office and grossed ₦75.4 million bringing its total cumulative to ₦398.5 million just after three weeks. Omo Ghetto was so popular that it accounted for about 65% of the box office in Nigeria. Omo Ghetto kept dominating the Nigerian box office, raking up ₦45.9 million to top the box office. It brought the cumulative box office figure to ₦444.5 million placing it as the second highest grossing Nollywood film of all time after just four weeks, Omo Ghetto the saga is currently the highest grossing Nigerian movie of all time with ₦468,036,300 just over a month 

Omo Ghetto continued dominating the box office in its fifth week grossing ₦35.7 thus bringing its cumulative to ₦480.5 million and becoming the highest grossing Nollywod movie of all time despite the COVID-19 pandemic. The film continued to extend its record by becoming the first Nollywood movie to stay six consecutive weeks at the top of the box office, grossing an additional ₦31.5 million. It also historically became the first ever Nigerian film to gross ₦500 million in Nollywood box office.

The film remained top at the box office in its seventh week, grossing an additional ₦27.3 million. bringing its cumulative to ₦539.6. Omo Ghetto topped the box office in its eighth, ninth and tenth week respectively becoming only the second movie in English speaking West Africa to cross the ₦600 million mark after Black Panther.

Awards and nominations

References

External links 

2020 comedy films
English-language Nigerian films
Films shot in Dubai
Nigerian comedy films
Nigerian sequel films
2020s English-language films
Yoruba-language films
Nigerian thriller films
Films shot in Lagos